A Touch of Taylor is an album by American jazz pianist Billy Taylor recorded in 1955 for the Prestige label. The album was one of the first 12-inch LPs released by the label.

Track listing
All compositions by Billy Taylor except as indicated
 "Ever So Easy" - 3:16
 "Radioactivity" - 3:45
 "A Bientot" - 4:19
 "Long Tom" - 2:48 
 "Day Dreaming" - 3:08
 "Live It Up" - 2:50  
 "Purple Mood" (Al Collins) - 2:46 
 "Early Bird" - 3:00   
 "Blue Cloud" - 3:37   
 It's a Grand Night for Swinging" - 2:59    
 "Memories of Spring" (Willis Conover) - 3:54   
 "Daddy-O" - 3:13

Personnel 
Billy Taylor – piano
Earl May – bass
Percy Brice – drums

References 

1955 albums
Albums recorded at Van Gelder Studio
Prestige Records albums
Billy Taylor albums